Antoine Théophile Darlan (1915 – 10 April 1974) was a Central African politician and trade unionist, known for being the local chief of the Rassemblement démocratique africain (RDA) party in Ubangi-Shari prior to independence.

Biography

One of the most prominent politicians of Ubangi-Shari

Antoine Darlan was born in 1915 in Kouango (Ouaka) to Elizabeth Mandalo, an Aboriginal, and Joseph Darlan a European of Portuguese origin. Although his official date of birth according to the Kouango birth registry was 8 June, it is impossible to know his true date of birth with certainty. His father never recognized him, and Darlan did not become a French citizen until 11 September 1937.

As a Méti, Antoine Darlan had easy access to education and joined the colonial administration as a bookkeeper. The political climate in the French colonial empire in the late 1930s was peculiar in that the colonized peopled had no civic rights. Antoine Darlan became a political activist in a meeting of Oubanguian indigenous cadres, the Association and the Association of Métis. In 1941 as a French citizen, he was drafted in the Free French forces. He received a Colonial Medal for his wartime service.

The end of the Second World War led to liberalization of colonial society. On 15 December 1946, for the first time an election for a representative council was organized in the colony. Darlan ran on the Action économique et sociale ticket and was elected, like his younger brother Georges Darlan. His peers choose him on 19 October 1947 to represent Ubangi-Shari in the French West Africa Federal Council in Brazzaville and in France at Versailles where the assembly seat of the French Union. According to historian Pierre Kalck, Antoine Darlan got to know the aboriginal member of the Ubangi-Shari Barthélemy Boganda.

By the end of 1947, Antoine Darlan was elected to the vice presidency of the Grand Council of French Equatorial Africa. Antoine Darlan was deemed intelligent and level-headed by Georges Darlan, who he impressed with his moderate approach to Socialists. On 19 December 1947, he proposed at the podium of the Grand Council to substitute the term "French Equatorial Africa" with "Equatorial France", a measure that was adopted unanimously by the great advisers. The French government did not follow it though. Antoine Darlan began to disagree with the Socialists on colonial policy to follow, he joined in 1948 the Rassemblement démocratique africain (RDA), an inter-African movement equated to the Communists.

The chief of the RDA in the colony
On 23 December 1948, he formed in Bangui an Ubanguian section of the GDR which he chaired. In this capacity, he participated in the Second International Congress of the RDA organized in January 1949 in Abidjan. Darlan's faction became a relative success. His influence on the Second Quorum advisers was significant. But his anticolonial opinions earned him the enmity of the colonial administration and elected representatives of the European College. His African colleagues led by his brother George Darlan, joined in 1949 the latter to reject his demands for propaganda purposes. His faction began receiving a large amount of defections in June. Losing influence among elites, Darlan Antoine turned to the working class. He hardened his speech and directed his action towards unionism. From then on he was very close to the General Confederation of Labor. In 1950, while the RDA broke with the French Communist Party, Darlan still promoted far-left politics.

Ironically, despite their opposing stances, his parliamentary actions were relatively similar with that of the Christian Democrat MP and anti-Communist Barthélemy Boganda. Both strongly denounced colonial abuses. He adopted in his articles published in the local organ of the GDR, AEF Nova, the strong positions similar to those of Boganda: on. 6 February 1949 Darlan wrote: "Our people are subjected to an odious exploitation. In this Ubangui with riches so varied and plentiful, the European element is considered as belonging to the superior race, the master race. The reactionary administration in the service of the colonial trusts has subjected the country to a reign of terror."

In early 1952, a chief quarrel between them emerged. The popularity and electoral success of Boganda increased quickly because of Darlan. At the local elections of 30 March 1952, he became territorial adviser of the Ouaka region for the Movement for the Social Evolution of Black Africa (MESAN). That same year, he left the Ubanguian section of the GDR to join MESAN.

Alliance with Boganda and disgrace
Despite becoming Boganda's partner, his relations with the head of MESAN remained delicate. Darlan was critical of his working method, considering it too personal and not democratic. Boganda for his part, was wary because of his popularity among the working class and intellectuals. Not reappointed High Councillor of French Equatorial Africa, Darlan was finally removed from the local political scene. He focused on its metropolitan position of advisor to the Assembly of the French Union in which he was reelected in October 1953 under the GDR ticket. He had indeed never broken with this party, and continued to attend its big meetings.

Darlan was a man who seemed to adapt to all situations. In 1955, despite his political beliefs, he accepted the co-vice-presidency of the Liberal Intergroup Ubangian (ILO) with Boganda and representatives of business, Rene Naud and Roger Guérillot. On 23 November 1956 he was elected deputy mayor of Bambari as a member of MESAN. In March 1957, he was re-elected territorial councilor of the Ouaka region, and in May he got back his great council seat of French Equatorial Africa under the MESAN ticket.

On 19 September 1957, Antoine Darlan was dismissed from MESAN. It seems that this decision was made by Roger Guérillot. Boganda did not find this too hard to accept. He blamed Darlan for not only his membership in the GDR and former communist training, but also his Métis heritage. Sooner or later Boganda believed, Darlan would be conspiring with others to take power, like mulattos during the Haitian Revolution. This dismissal began the decline of his political career.

Later life
In March 1958, the RDA pushes him to run for president of the Grand Council against the incumbent president Boganda. After a long hesitation, Darlan withdrew. Five months after the adoption of the French Community, the Assembly of the French Union dissolved and thus its position of Councillor. On 24 and 25 November 1958 he participated in the Brazzaville meeting to decide on the fate of French Equatorial Africa. On this issue, he fell into the camp of the Federalists with Leopold Senghor and Boganda, opposed to separatist ideas championed by the leader of the GDR, Felix Houphouët-Boigny.

Beginning in June 1958, Antoine Darlan was a new member of the Ubanguian section of the RDA that was reconstituted in 1957 among others by his brother George Darlan. Antoine Darlan quickly took control along with Hilaire Kotalimbora and turned it further left-wing. This was unacceptable for the president-founder of the GDR, Ivorian Houphouet-Boigny, who campaigned against him in the April 1959 legislative elections. Antoine Darlan was replaced as head of the GDR by his brother George Darlan. The election was a disaster for the GDR, MESAN won all seats, and Antoine Darlan was not elected. The Ubanguian section of the GDR fell into a deep crisis in the spring of 1959. Meanwhile Boganda died and a conflict between his proteges ensued. Darlan agreed with the democratic changes in Central Africa Movement (MEDAC) of Abel Goumba to counter the new strongman of MESAN, David Dacko. But this purely theoretical agreement ended when the MÉDAC dissolved the Council of Ministers at the order of Dacko on December 23, 1960. In 1962, it was his turn to see its GDR section dissolved with the institutionalization of the single party.

Withdrawing permanently from political life, he turned instead to public service. Assigned to the Treasury and Finance Department of Foreign Affairs and finally the Plan, Darlan had a stable job where his qualities were appreciated. Transferred to France to be treated, he died in the hospital of Villejuif on 10 April 1974 . He was buried in the cemetery of Ndress in Bangui in the 7th arrondissement. Since 1980, in a  decision by the President of the Central African Republic David Dacko, an avenue was named in his honor to pay tribute to his political career. This avenue starts from the central police station and crossing the "200 Villas" and the Avenue of Martyrs to reach Benzvil neighborhoods and Castors.

References

1915 births
1974 deaths
People of French Equatorial Africa
Rassemblement Démocratique Africain politicians
Central African Republic politicians